Gruffudd Fychan II was Lord of Glyndyfrdwy and Lord of Cynllaith Owain c.1330–1369.  As such, he had a claim to be hereditary Prince of Powys Fadog.

Ancestry 
The epithet 'Fychan' implies that his father was also called Gruffudd.  However certain genealogical tables convey conflicting data. It has been thought that he was the son of Madog Crypl who died in 1304. However, for him to inherit the succession and hold it until 1369 seems unlikely. Other tables suggest his father was Gruffudd ap Madog Fychan, a son of Madog Fychan.

Most probably, he was the grandson of Madog Crypl, whose son Gruffudd was aged about six at his father's death, but already married.  Gruffudd was still alive in 1343.

Marriage and children 

Gruffudd Fychan II was married to Elen (Eleanor), great-granddaughter of Eleanor Plantagenet, the daughter of King Edward Longshanks and Queen Eleanor of Castile, members of the Royal House of Plantagenet and Ivrea. Her father Thomas ap Llywelyn, Representative of the last sovereign Princes of South Wales, was Lord of South Wales, which included half of the commote of Is Coed and a quarter of Gwynionydd, both in Ceredigion. 

Elen's sister, Marged ferch Tomos, became the wife of Tudur ap Goronwy, of the Tudors of Penmynydd, and the grandmother of Sir Owen Tudor, of the House of Tudor.

Her father's cousins included Eleanor (died 1332), who married to Rudolph, Duke of Lorraine, son of Elisabeth of Habsburg, and Beatrice, who married to Imperial vicar Guido Gonzaga, Lord of Mantua, member of the Princely House of Gonzaga.

Her grandmother, Eleanor of Bar, being a granddaughter of Count Theobald II, was a niece of Isabelle of Lorraine and Matthias of Lorraine. Isabelle was a daughter of Duke Theobald II, and Matthias was a son of Duke Frederick III, both members of the Imperial House of Lorraine, which later merged with the House of Habsburg and became the House of Habsburg-Lorraine. 

Through Robert II, Duke of Burgundy, and Princess Agnes of France, Eleanor's in-laws included the Royal families of Edward, Count of Savoy, of the House of Savoy, King Louis X of the House of Capet, and King Philip VI of the House of Valois, among others.

Gruffudd Fychan II and Elen (Eleanor) had issue:

 Madog, died young
 Owain ap Gruffudd, later known as Owain Glyndŵr, proclaimed Prince of Wales and Leader of the Welsh Revolt in September 1400 which lasted to 1412 or 1416. He married Margaret Hanmer, daughter of Sir David Hanmer and had issue.
 Lowry, married Robert Puleston, and had issue. Their son Roger became Deputy Constable of Denbigh Castle to Jasper Tudor, Duke of Bedford, member of the House of Tudor
 Isabel ferch Gruffudd, married Adda ap Iorwerth Ddu, and had issue.
 Gruffudd
 Tudur ap Gruffudd, Lord of Gwyddelwern, was a Leader and Commander in the Welsh Revolt against Henry V and his father, members of the House of Lancaster

Death 

He was buried at the Church of St. Asaph & St Cyndeyrn in Llanasa where the remains of his tomb can be seen today.

References

1369 deaths
Monarchs of Powys
Year of birth unknown
14th-century monarchs in Europe
14th-century Welsh people